Christopher Lars Nelson (born September 3, 1985) is an American former professional baseball infielder. Nelson has played in Major League Baseball (MLB) for the Colorado Rockies from 2010 through 2013, New York Yankees in 2013, the Los Angeles Angels of Anaheim in 2013 and the San Diego Padres in 2014.

High school
Nelson played baseball at Redan High School in Stone Mountain, Georgia. He was one of the nation's top pitching prospects before undergoing Tommy John surgery following his junior season. As a senior, he batted .552. Nelson committed to play college baseball at Georgia.

Professional career

Colorado Rockies
The Colorado Rockies selected Nelson in the first round, with the ninth overall selection, of the 2004 amateur entry draft, and received the third largest signing bonus in Rockies history. In July 2007, while playing for the Modesto Nuts, Nelson was named Rockies Farm Player of the Month.

Nelson was called up on June 18, 2010, to replace Troy Tulowitzki, who had broken his wrist. He was expected to play second base, with Clint Barmes moving to shortstop.

On September 9, 2010, Nelson stole home plate against Cincinnati Reds pitcher Nick Masset, scoring what would be the deciding run in the Rockies' victory, their seventh straight. It was Nelson's first career stolen base, and the first time he had stolen home plate at any level.

Though he struggled at the MLB level during the 2011 season, Nelson was announced as the third base starter along with Jordan Pacheco during Spring Training in 2012. He was designated for assignment on April 28, 2013.

New York Yankees
On May 1, Nelson was traded to the New York Yankees. On May 15, he was designated for assignment to make room on the roster for David Adams.

Los Angeles Angels of Anaheim
On May 18, 2013, Nelson was claimed off waivers by the Los Angeles Angels of Anaheim. He was designated for assignment on June 10, 2013, and accepted an assignment to the Triple-A Salt Lake Bees on June 13. Following the trade of Alberto Callaspo on July 31, Nelson's contract was selected from Salt Lake. On August 15, he hit his first career grand slam against Yankees reliever Boone Logan. After the season, Nelson was non-tendered by the Angels, making him a free agent.

Cincinnati Reds
On January 28, 2014, Nelson signed a minor league deal with the Cincinnati Reds. On June 16, 2014, Nelson was released by the Reds.

San Diego Padres
On June 19, 2014, Nelson signed a minor league deal with the San Diego Padres. On July 18, 2014, Nelson was called up from Triple-A El Paso and made his Padres debut against the New York Mets, going 2–4 with 2 RBI. He was designated for assignment on September 2, 2014. Nelson elected free agency in October 2014.

Philadelphia Phillies
Nelson signed a minor league deal with the Philadelphia Phillies on November 25, 2014.

Milwaukee Brewers
Nelson signed a minor league deal with the Milwaukee Brewers on May 9, 2015. And he was released on June 17, 2015.

Washington Nationals
Nelson signed a minor league deal with the Washington Nationals on June 21, 2015. He was released by the Washington Nationals on July 25, 2015.

Return to Colorado
On February 15, 2016, Nelson signed a minor league deal to return to Colorado.

Sugar Land Skeeters
On March 21, 2017, Nelson signed with the Sugar Land Skeeters of the Atlantic League of Professional Baseball.

Kansas City Royals
On May 15, 2017, Nelson signed a minor league deal with the Kansas City Royals.

He was named Bench Coach for the Northwest Arkansas Naturals, AA affiliate of the Kansas City Royals, for the 2018 season.

Awards and honors

References

External links

MiLB.com player profile

1985 births
Living people
People from Decatur, Georgia
African-American baseball players
Major League Baseball infielders
Colorado Rockies players
New York Yankees players
Los Angeles Angels players
San Diego Padres players
Casper Rockies players
Asheville Tourists players
Modesto Nuts players
Tulsa Drillers players
Colorado Springs Sky Sox players
Salt Lake Bees players
Louisville Bats players
El Paso Chihuahuas players
Waikiki Beach Boys players
Phoenix Desert Dogs players
Lehigh Valley IronPigs players
Syracuse Chiefs players
Naranjeros de Hermosillo players
American expatriate baseball players in Mexico
Albuquerque Isotopes players
Sugar Land Skeeters players
21st-century African-American sportspeople
20th-century African-American people